The National Lacrosse League Cup is the trophy awarded each year to the champions of the National Lacrosse League.  Prior to 2018, the league awarded the Champions Cup.

Winners

Most Valuable Players

All-time Finals appearances since league inception

All-time league championships

National Lacrosse League Cup Appearances

All-time National Lacrosse League Cup wins

Champion's Cup appearances
Awarded from 1998 to 2017

All-time Champion's Cup wins

North American Cup era
For the 1987 and 1988 seasons, the league was known as the Eagle Pro Box Lacrosse League; from the 1989 season until the conclusion of the 1997 season, the league was known as the Major Indoor Lacrosse League. In 1998, the Major Indoor Lacrosse League changed to become the National Lacrosse League. During the entire non-NLL name era (1987-1997), a different trophy was awarded to the league champion called the North American Cup. It was a tall, skinny, silver-colored trophy that somewhat resembled the Stanley Cup.

North American Cup era league champions

See also
Mann Cup

References

National Lacrosse League awards
Awards established in 1998